Elyse Grinstein (1929July 2, 2016) was an American architect and art collector who lived and worked in Los Angeles. She co-founded Gemini G.E.L., an art publisher. Elyse was married to Stanley Grinstein.

Further reading

References 

American art collectors
1929 births
2016 deaths
American publishers (people)
Architects from Los Angeles